Hubert Louis Will (April 23, 1914 – December 9, 1995) was a United States district judge of the United States District Court for the Northern District of Illinois.

Education and career

Born in Milwaukee, Wisconsin, Will received an Artium Baccalaureus degree from the University of Chicago in 1935 and a Juris Doctor from the University of Chicago Law School in 1937. He was a staff attorney with the General Counsel's Office at the Securities and Exchange Commission from 1937 to 1939. In 1939, he served as special secretary to United States Senator Robert F. Wagner. The same year he was appointed clerk of the United States Senate Committee on Banking, Housing, and Urban Affairs. From 1940 to 1941, he became a special assistant to United States Attorney General, serving in the Tax Division. He was an assistant to the General Counsel for the Office of Price Administration in 1942. He was tax counsel at the Alien Property Custodian in 1943. He was a Chief of the Counter-Espionage Branch, European Theater, of the Office of Strategic Services from 1943 to 1945. He was commissioned a captain in the United States Army at the end of World War II, serving from 1945 to 1946. He entered private practice in Chicago, Illinois thereafter and continued until his appointment to the federal bench.

Federal judicial service

Will was nominated by President John F. Kennedy on September 14, 1961, to a new seat on the United States District Court for the Northern District of Illinois created by 75 Stat. 80. He was confirmed on September 21, 1961, and received his commission on September 22, 1961. He assumed senior status on April 23, 1979, and served in that capacity until his death on December 9, 1995, in Oconomowoc, Wisconsin.

References

Sources
 

1914 births
1995 deaths
Judges of the United States District Court for the Northern District of Illinois
United States district court judges appointed by John F. Kennedy
20th-century American judges
Lawyers from Milwaukee
United States Army officers
20th-century American lawyers